Arash Labbaf (born 23 April 1977) is an Iranian-Swedish singer, entertainer, and producer.

He represented Azerbaijan along with Aysel in the Eurovision Song Contest 2009, finishing third with the song "Always". He is also one of the judges of Persia's Got Talent, a Persian franchise of the British talent show Got Talent.

Early life 
Arash Labbaf was born in Tehran, Iran. He and his parents lived near Mellat Park. At age ten, he and his family moved to Sweden, where he still resides. In an interview with BBC Persian Television, he has mentioned that his mother and father are from the Iranian cities of Shiraz and Isfahan, respectively.

Arash Labbaf has stated in his interviews that he is interested in association football, accordingly, he released songs about association football. Also, in an interview with Deutsche Welle, Arash stated that he had been interested in singing since childhood and he even formed an informal band with his friends.

Career 

Arash labbaf has said that the reason he chooses to sing in his native language is because of his "deep attachment to Iran and Persian culture."

His debut album, Arash, was released by Warner Music Sweden in June 2005, after he had finished college. His singles, "Boro Boro" ("Go Away") and "Temptation" (featuring Rebecca) made it to the hit lists around Europe, and their respective videos garnered significant airplay on more than 20 MTV outlets across the world. In addition to successes in his home countries' music charts, namely Sweden and Iran, the platinum-selling singer and producer Arash has had hits notably in Eastern European and South-East European charts like Russia, Ukraine, Greece, Bulgaria, Poland, Hungary, Georgia, Armenia, Azerbaijan, Serbia, Slovakia, Slovenia, Romania, Turkey and in Asian music charts like in Tajikistan, Kazakhstan, Afghanistan, Uzbekistan and throughout the Arab Middle Eastern countries. His singles have been charted many times on Swiss and Finnish charts and he is especially famous in Poland.

Arash's records were certified gold in 5 countries: his album Arash in Germany, Russia, Slovenia, and Greece and the single "Boro Boro" in Sweden. This song was also featured in the Hindi Bollywood film Bluffmaster! and he was the featured Artist of the Month on MTV India.

Helena did not take part in the music video of Pure Love, although her voice was used in it. The video starred Arash, together with the Venezuelan beauty queen, Marianne Puglia.

Arash has produced along with Thomas G:son, Robert Uhlmann, and Johan Bejerholm the Swedish entry to the Junior Eurovision Song Contest 2010 "Allt jag vill ha" that was performed by Josefine Ridell.

Eurovision Song Contest

In early 2009, it was revealed that the Azerbaijani entry for the Eurovision Song Contest 2009 would be the song "Always" which was written and composed by Arash. The song was performed by Aysel Teymurzadeh and Arash in a duet in Semifinal 2 of the Eurovision competition.  The song qualified for the Eurovision Song Contest final which took place on 16 May 2009, and was placed third. In one of his interviews, Arash explained his decision to represent Azerbaijan in this contest: "Why did I take part in the contest? I'm originally [ethnically] Azerbaijani, and I would like to have a part in this country's confident ascent in the history of Eurovision."

Personal life 
Labaf married his longtime fiancée, Behnaz Ansari, in Dubai in May 2011.

Discography 

Studio albums
 Arash (2005)
 Donya (2008)
 Superman (2014)

Filmography 
2005: Bluffmaster! as playback singer
2012: Rhinos Season as  Son (as Twins/Male)

References

External links 

Official website
Arash at warnermusic.de

1977 births
Living people
Folk-pop singers
Iranian musicians
People from Tehran
Swedish pop singers
Singers from Tehran
Iranian pop singers
Swedish male singers
Iranian Azerbaijanis
Iranian male singers
Extensive Music artists
Persian-language singers
Iranian record producers
21st-century male singers
Warner Music Group artists
Iranian singer-songwriters
Iranian emigrants to Sweden
Warner Music Sweden artists
21st-century Swedish singers
Iranian expatriates in Sweden
21st-century Iranian male singers
21st-century Swedish male singers
Swedish people of Iranian descent
Swedish people of Azerbaijani descent
Iranian people of Azerbaijani descent
Winners of the Golden Gramophone Award
Eurovision Song Contest entrants of 2009
Eurovision Song Contest entrants for Azerbaijan